Poria – Neve Oved is a community settlement in northern Israel. Located to the south-east of the Sea of Galilee near Tiberias, it falls under the jurisdiction of Emek HaYarden Regional Council.

History
The village was founded in 1949 by immigrants from North Africa. In the past most of its residents worked in local factories or nearby kibbutzim, but today most are professionals working in Tiberias and the Lower Galilee.

References

Community settlements
Populated places established in 1949
Populated places in Northern District (Israel)
1949 establishments in Israel
North African-Jewish culture in Israel